Richard Park may refer to:
Richard Park (ice hockey) (born 1976), Korean-born American ice hockey player
Richard Park (broadcaster) (born 1948), British media personality and businessman
Richard Henry Park (1832–1902), American sculptor

See also
Richard Parke (1893–1950), American bobsledder
Richard Park Ward (born 1969), American guitarist
Richard Parks (disambiguation)